Jeffrey Braithwaite BA [UNE], DipIR, MIR [Syd], MBA [Macq], PhD [UNSW], FIML, FACHSM, FAAHMS, FFPHRCP [UK], FAcSS [UK], Hon FRACMA is an Australian professor, health services and systems researcher, writer and commentator. He is Founding Director of the Australian Institute of Health Innovation at Macquarie University, Sydney, Australia; Director of the Centre for Healthcare Resilience and Implementation Science, Australian Institute of Health Innovation; Professor of Health Systems Research, Macquarie University; Professor, Centre for Implementation of Hearing Research, Macquarie University.

His work appears in journals such as the British Medical Journal,The Journal of the American Medical Association The Lancet, Social Science & Medicine, BMJ Quality & Safety, and the International Journal for Quality in Health Care.

Braithwaite has a TED Talk on the future of humanity “Turning, breaking or vanishing point?”

He has a website devoted to wide-ranging intellectual contributions - about the universe, life, history, the Anthropocene, and the humanities - drawing on ideas and studies from philosophy, psychology, big history, science and cosmology - Naturally Curious ...

Career 
He has tertiary qualifications in psychology, industrial relations and business administration and holds a Doctorate of Philosophy from the University of New South Wales.

In 2000 he was appointed a Fellow of the Australian Institute of Management (FAIM), now known as the Institute of Managers and Leaders (FIML). In 2001 he was conferred as Fellow of the Australasian College of Health Service Management (FCHSM) and in 2012 as Honorary Fellow of the Royal Australasian College of Medical Administrators. In 2014 he was made Fellow in the distinction grade, Faculty of Public Health, Royal College of Physicians, United Kingdom (FFPH, RCP). In 2015 he was conferred as Fellow of the Academy of Social Sciences, United Kingdom (FAcSS). In 2017 he was awarded Fellow of the Australian Academy of Health and Medical Sciences (FAAHMS).

In 2017 the International Society for Quality in Healthcare announced his appointment as President-Elect for 2017-2020 and he is now president 2020-2022.

Braithwaite has appointments with six other universities internationally including Honorary Senior International Research Fellow at the Canon Institute for Global Studies (Japan), Honorary Professor, University of Birmingham (UK), Honorary Professor, Newcastle University (UK), Adjunct Professor for Resilient Health Care and Patient Safety, University of Southern Denmark (Denmark) and Honorary Professor, University of Stavanger (Norway).

He is a Professor of Health Systems Research with the Faculty of Medicine, Health and Human Sciences at Macquarie University and his publications can be viewed on Google Scholar.

Research contributions 
Braithwaite has published research on resilient healthcare, implementation science, health systems sustainability, complexity science, patient safety, international healthcare reform, professional cultures, change and restructuring. His publications can be viewed on Google Scholar.

Resilient Healthcare 

From 2011 with colleagues including Professor Erik Hollnagel, University of Southern Denmark, Professor Bob Wears, University of Florida, and Doctor Garth Hunte, St. Paul's and Mount St. Joseph Hospital and as part of Denmark's Resilient Health Care Net initiative, Braithwaite co-authored a series of books on resilient healthcare and Safety II.

Braithwaite has provided policy and development support to the Resilient Health Care Net and annual Conference with Professor Erik Hollnagel.

Implementation science 

In 2017 Braithwaite was awarded a National Health and Medical Research Council project grant for the Centre for Research Excellence in Implementation Science in Oncology to turn research knowledge into effective patient-centred practice by bringing together researchers, policy makers, clinicians and patients.

Health system sustainability 

In 2016 Braithwaite was awarded a National Health and Medical Research Council partnership centre grant to establish the Centre for Health System Sustainability to support the implementation of research-informed improvements in healthcare.

In 2019 Braithwaite was awarded a National Health and Medical Research Council investigator grant to design and implement a real-world learning healthcare system.

Complexity science and patient safety 

Braithwaite has commented publicly on patient safety and the complex nature of healthcare systems and how the number of adverse events experienced by patients in hospital has not decreased.

In 2017, Braithwaite's white paper Complexity Science in Healthcare – Aspirations, Approaches, Applications and Accomplishments was published. It advocates for healthcare to be recognised as a complex adaptive system and outlines potential applications to healthcare in Australia and worldwide. Braithwaite is a partner with the Australian Genomics Health Alliance.

Braithwaite co-led the CareTrack Australia project, part of a National Health and Medical Research Council program grant, that examined the appropriateness of the care provided in Australia. It showed that adults in Australian received appropriate care in 57% of consultations. Results were published in the Medical Journal of Australia. Runciman WB, Hunt TD, Hannaford NA, Hibbert PD, Westbrook JI, Coiera E, Day RO, Hindmarsh DM, McGlynn EA, Braithwaite J. CareTrack: Assessing the appropriateness of healthcare delivery in Australia. Medical Journal of Australia. 2012; 197(2):100-5.

Results from the CareTrack Kids study published in the Journal of the American Medical Association which he also co-led showed children in Australia receive care in line with clinical practice guideline recommendations on average 60 percent of the time. Braithwaite J, Hibbert P, Jaffe A, White L, Cowell C, Harris M, Runciman W, Hallahan AR, Wheaton G, Williams H, Murphy E, Molloy C, Wiles L, Ramanathan S, Arnolda G, Ting HP, Hooper TD, Szabo N, Wakefield JG, Hughes CF, Schmiede A, Dalton C, Dalton S, Holt J, Donaldson L, Kelley E, Lilford R, Lachman P, Muething S. The quality of health care for children in Australia. Journal of the American Medical Association. 2018; 319(11):1113-24.

International healthcare reform 

Braithwaite has consulted to the World Health Organization (WHO) and AusAid, particularly to the governments of East Timor, Laos, Papua New Guinea and the People's Republic of China; to WHO Centre for Health Development Kobe in Japan (also known as WHO Kobe Centre) and the Shanghai Municipal Health Bureau. Braithwaite has been an International member of the WHO Global Patient Safety Network, Geneva, Switzerland since 2015. He is a Technical Advisor to the Regional Director of the Eastern Mediterranean Region of WHO, 2019-2021.

In 2015 Braithwaite edited Healthcare Reform, Quality and Safety: Perspectives, Participants, Partnerships and Prospects in 30 Countries which showcased success stories of healthcare systems worldwide. This was followed by a second book in this series, Health Systems Improvement across the globe – success stories from 60 countries - which invited authors from poor-, middle- and high-income countries to contribute articles illustrating where their health system has done well and providing lessons for other countries. A third book in the reform series covered 152 countries, Healthcare Systems: Future Predictions for Global Care.

He has contributed to policy and the development of multiple international organisations including with, or advising, the Canon Institute for Global Studies (Japan), Netherlands Institute for Health Services Research (NIVEL), and Haute Autorité de Santé (France) between 2008 and the present.

Braithwaite developed and taught various educational activities on health services management for the Shanghai Health Bureau, People's Republic of China, on behalf of the World Health Organization between 1997 and 2000.

He developed a strategic approach to research and provided input to a research plan for the Danish Institute for Quality and Accreditation in Healthcare  (IKAS), the Danish accreditation provider, over 2009-2010.

Selected Awards and honours

References 

Year of birth missing (living people)
Living people
Australian public health doctors
Fellows of the Australian Academy of Health and Medical Sciences
University of New South Wales alumni
Academic staff of Macquarie University
University of New England (Australia) alumni
University of Sydney alumni